Sergei Safonovich Gurzo (1926–1974) was a Russian stage and film actor. He was married to the dancer and actress Irina Gubanova.

Biography 
Sergei Gurzo born September 23, 1926 in Moscow patriarchal family. His grandfather was an archpriest, his father a doctor, his mother taught the exact sciences in Gnessin State Musical College. Sergei's uncle   Ivan Mikhailovich Kudryavtsev was a People's Artist of the USSR, he played on the stage of the Moscow Art Theater.

Selected filmography
 The Young Guard (1948) as Sergei Tyulenin
 On Peaceful Days (1950) as Pavlo Panychuk
 Far from Moscow (1951) as Petya Gudkin
 Brave People (1950) as Vasily Terentevich Govorukhin
 The Encounter of a Lifetime (1952) as Vasov
 A Fortress in the Mountains (1953) as Kuleshov
 Those Born of Storm (1957) as Andrey Ptakha

References

Bibliography 
 Birgit Beumers. Directory of World Cinema: Russia. Volume II. Intellect Books, 2015.

External links 
 

1926 births
1974 deaths
Soviet male film actors
Soviet male stage actors
Male actors from Moscow
Stalin Prize winners
Gerasimov Institute of Cinematography alumni